Thierno Gaye (born 20 November 1999) is a Senegalese professional footballer who plays for Olympic Charleroi in the Belgian National Division 1. 

Gaye made his professional debut for OH Leuven on 11 February 2020 in the home match against Union SG, getting suspended at the hour mark after collecting two yellow cards.

References 

1999 births
Living people
Senegalese footballers
Senegalese expatriate footballers
Expatriate footballers in Belgium
Expatriate footballers in Luxembourg
Association football defenders
Oud-Heverlee Leuven players
FC Swift Hesperange players
R. Olympic Charleroi Châtelet Farciennes players
Challenger Pro League players